This is a list of some of the breeds of horse considered in France to be wholly or partly of French origin. Some may have complex or obscure histories, so inclusion here does not necessarily imply that a breed is predominantly or exclusively French.

 Ardennais
 Ardennais du Nord
 AQPS
 Auvergne horse
 Auxois
 Barraquand horse
 Boulonnais
 Breton
 Camargue horse
 Castillonnais
 Comtois
 Corlais
 Corsican horse
 French Anglo-Arab
 French Saddle Pony
 French Trotter
 Henson
 Landais
 Mérens
 Nivernais
 Norman Cob
 Percheron
 Poitevin
 Pottok
 Selle français
 Trait du Nord
 Vercors horse - see Barraquand horse

Minor, suppressed and extinct breeds
 Angevin
 Anglo-Normand
 Augeron
 Baudet du Poitou
 Berrichon
 Bidets
 Bourbonnais
 Bourbourien - see Boulonnais
 Bourguignon
 Bresse horse
 Carrossier Normand
 Cauchoix - see Boulonnais
 Centre-montagne - see Breton
 Charentais
 Charolais
 Cotentin horse
 Demi-sang du Centre
 Dombes horse
 Limousin horse
 Mareyeur - see Boulonnais
 Morvan horse
 Navarrin horse
 Petit Boulonnais - see Boulonnais
 Postier Breton - see Breton
 Tarbésan
 Trait Breton - see Breton
 Trait de la Loire
 Trait de Saône-et-Loire
 Trait du Maine
 Trait Picard - see Boulonnais
 Vendéen

References

 
Horse